Katsundo Kosaka (1901 – 1953) was a Japanese painter. His work was part of the painting event in the art competition at the 1932 Summer Olympics.

References

1901 births
1953 deaths
20th-century Japanese painters
Japanese painters
Olympic competitors in art competitions
People from Toyama Prefecture
Artists from Toyama Prefecture